KATQ-FM 100.1 FM, is a radio station licensed to serve Plentywood, Montana.  The station is owned by the Radio International KATQ Broadcast Association, airing a classic rock format. Studios at 112 Third Avenue East.

The station was assigned the KATQ-FM call letters by the Federal Communications Commission on June 18, 1979.

The station flipped from country music (simulcasting KATQ-AM) to classic rock in February 2013.

References

External links
KATQ studio and transmitter photos

ATQ-FM
Classic rock radio stations in the United States
Sheridan County, Montana
Radio stations established in 1962
1962 establishments in Montana